The 2022 United States House of Representatives elections in Florida were held on November 8, 2022, to elect the 28 U.S. representatives from Florida, one from each of the state's 28 congressional districts. The primary was held on August 23, 2022. The elections coincided with the 2022 United States Senate election in Florida, other elections to the House of Representatives, other elections to the United States Senate, and various state and local elections.

The Republican Party gained four seats, increasing their majority from 16-11 to 20-8. No Republican lost re-election.

Results summary

Statewide

District
Results of the 2022 United States House of Representatives elections in Florida by district:

District 1

Republican Matt Gaetz, who has represented the district since 2017, was re-elected with 64.6% of the vote in 2020. He won re-election in 2022.

The boundaries of the district have been redrawn from 2020 determined by the 2020 redistricting cycle.

Republican primary

Candidates

Nominee
Matt Gaetz, incumbent U.S. representative

Eliminated in primary
Mark Lombardo, Marine combat veteran, former FedEx executive and pilot
Greg Merk, former U.S. Air Force officer and candidate for this district in 2020

Withdrawn 
Angela Marie Walls-Windhauser, perennial candidate
Bryan Jones, pilot

Did not qualify 
John Mills, former U.S. Navy officer and candidate for this district in 2016, 2018, and 2020
Jeremy Kelly, U.S. Marine Corps veteran

Declined 
 Doug Bates, attorney
 Chris Dosev, businessman and candidate for this district in 2016 and 2018
 Ashton Hayward, former mayor of Pensacola
 Mike Hill, former state representative
 Larry Keefe, former U.S. attorney for the Northern District of Florida
 Carolyn Ketchel, Okaloosa County commissioner
 Grover C. Robinson IV, mayor of Pensacola
 Frank White, former state representative and candidate for Florida attorney general in 2018
 Alex Andrade, state representative (running for re-election)
 Doug Broxson, state senator (running for re-election)
 George Gainer, state senator (running for re-election)
 Laura Loomer, reporter for InfoWars, far-right activist, and nominee for Florida's 21st congressional district in 2020 (running in the 11th district)
 Anna Paulina Luna, director of Hispanic Engagement for Turning Point USA and nominee for Florida's 13th congressional district in 2020 (running in the 13th district)
 Jimmy Patronis, Chief Financial Officer of Florida (running for re-election)
 Anthony Sabatini, state representative (running in the 7th district)
 Jayer Williamson, state representative (running for re-election)

Endorsements

Results

Democratic primary

Candidates

Nominee 
Rebekah Jones, former Florida Department of Health analyst (Disqualified, granted stay order by Appellate Court, then reinstated to ballot)

Eliminated in primary
Peggy Schiller, attorney

Declined 
 Dianne Krumel, Florida Democratic Party committeewoman
 Lumon May, Escambia County commissioner
 Jennifer Zimmerman, pediatrician and nominee for this district in 2018

Results

General election

Debate

Predictions

Polling

Results

District 2

Republican Neal Dunn, who has represented the district since 2017, was re-elected with 97% of the vote in 2020. Dunn won re-election in 2022.

The boundaries of the district have been redrawn from 2020 determined by the 2020 redistricting cycle.

Republican primary

Candidates

Nominee
Neal Dunn, incumbent U.S. representative

Democratic primary

Candidates

Nominee
Al Lawson, incumbent U.S. representative

Withdrawn 

 Karen Stripling, Southern Poverty Law Center activist

Endorsements

Independent and third party candidates

Independents

General election

Predictions

Polling

Results

District 3

Republican Kat Cammack, who has represented the district since 2021, was elected with 57% of the vote in 2020. Cammack won re-election in 2022.

The boundaries of the district have been redrawn from 2020 determined by the 2020 redistricting cycle.

Republican primary

Nominee
Kat Cammack, incumbent U.S. Representative

Eliminated in primary
Justin Waters, lawyer

Withdrawn
Manuel Asensio, businessman

Endorsements

Results

Democratic primary

Candidates

Nominee 
Danielle Hawk, customer service representative

Eliminated in primary
Tom Wells, physicist and candidate for this seat in 2018 and 2020

Endorsements

Results

Independents
Linda Brooks, historian

General election

Predictions

Results

District 4

The boundaries of the district have been redrawn from 2020 determined by the 2020 redistricting cycle.

Democratic primary

Candidates

Nominee
LaShonda Holloway, former congressional aide and candidate for Florida's 5th congressional district in 2016 and 2020

Eliminated in primary
Tony Hill, former state senator (2002–2011)

Declined
Audrey Gibson, state senator (2011–present) and former Minority Leader of the Florida Senate (2018–2020) (running for mayor of Jacksonville)

Endorsements

Results

Republican primary

Candidates

Declared

Nominee
Aaron Bean, president pro tempore of the Florida Senate

Eliminated in primary 
Jon Chuba, insurance analyst
Erick Aguilar, US Navy retired, professor and candidate for FL-04 in 2020

Withdrawn
Jason Fischer, member of the Florida House of Representatives (running for Duval County property appraiser)

Declined
Lenny Curry, mayor of Jacksonville (endorsed Bean)
Rory Diamond, member of the Jacksonville City Council (endorsed Bean)

Endorsements

Polling

Results

Independents 
Gary Lee Konitz, investigative journalist (write-in candidate)

General election

Predictions

Polling

Results

District 5

Republican John Rutherford, who has represented the district since 2017, was re-elected with 61% of the vote in 2020. Rutherford won re-election unopposed in 2022.

The boundaries of the district have been redrawn from 2020 determined by the 2020 redistricting cycle.

Republican primary

Candidates

Nominee
John Rutherford, incumbent U.S. representative

Eliminated in primary
Mara Macie, stay-at-home mom
Leigha 'Luna' Garner-Lopez, psychologist

Results

Democratic primary

Candidates
No Democratic candidates filed to run.

General election

Predictions

Results

District 6

Republican Michael Waltz, who has represented the district since 2019, was elected with 60% of the vote in 2020. Waltz won re-election in 2022.

The boundaries of the district have been redrawn from 2020 determined by the 2020 redistricting cycle.

Republican primary

Candidates

Nominee
 Michael Waltz, incumbent U.S. representative

Eliminated in primary 
 Charles Davis, mortgage banker

Endorsements

Results

Democratic primary

Candidates

Did not qualify
Clint Curtis, lawyer and nominee for California's 4th congressional district in 2010 and for Florida's 6th congressional district in 2020
Matt Bell

Withdrawn
Richard Thripp, former chair of the Volusia County Democratic Party and candidate for this district in 2020

Declined 
 Gary Conroy, vice mayor of Edgewater

Independent and third-party candidates

Libertarian Party

Nominee 

 Joe Hannoush, information systems technician

Independents

Did not qualify
John Gerald Nolan, businessman and write-in candidate for this district in 2020

General election

Predictions

Results

District 7

Democrat Stephanie Murphy, who has represented the district since 2017, was re-elected with 55% of the vote in 2020. Murphy initially stated she would run for re-election, but on December 20, 2021, she announced she would not run.

The boundaries of the district have been redrawn from 2020 determined by the 2020 redistricting cycle.

This district is included on the list of Democratic-held seats the National Republican Congressional Committee is targeting in 2022.

Democratic primary

Candidates

Nominee
Karen Green, vice chair of the Florida Democratic Party

Eliminated in primary
Tatiana Fernandez, businesswoman
Al Krulick, perennial candidate
Allen Pastrano, cyber engineer

Declined
Emily Bonilla, Orange County commissioner
Carlos Guillermo Smith, state representative (endorsed Green)
Chris King, financial executive and nominee for lieutenant governor in 2018
Anna Eskamani, state representative (running for re-election) (endorsed Green)
 Stephanie Murphy, incumbent U.S. representative and Co-Chair of the Blue Dog Coalition

Endorsements

Results

Republican primary

Candidates

Nominee
Cory Mills, U.S. Army veteran and defense consultant

Eliminated in primary
Erika Benfield, former DeBary city commissioner
Brady Duke, pastor and former Navy SEAL
Ted Edwards, former Orange County commissioner
Rusty Roberts, former chief of staff for former U.S. Representative John Mica
Anthony Sabatini, state representative
Armando Santos, businessman 
Scott Sturgill, businessman

Withdrawn
Kevin John "Mac" McGovern, retired U.S. Navy captain (running in the 15th district)
Kristopher Stark, real estate agent

Declined
Lee Constantine, Seminole County Commissioner (District 3), former state senator and state representative
Mark Busch, vice mayor of Casselberry and candidate for this district in 2016

Endorsements

Polling

\

Results

General election

Predictions

Results

District 8

Republican Bill Posey, who has represented the district since 2009, was re-elected with 61% of the vote in 2020. Posey won re-election in 2022.

The boundaries of the district have been redrawn from 2020 determined by the 2020 redistricting cycle.

Republican primary

Candidates

Nominee
 Bill Posey, incumbent U.S. representative

Did not qualify
Patrick Wells, former Department of Defense contractor

Endorsements

Democratic primary

Candidates

Nominee
Joanne Terry, former satellite systems engineer

Eliminated in primary
Danelle Dodge, technology consultant and activist

Results

General election

Predictions

Results

District 9

Democrat Darren Soto, who has represented the district since 2017, was re-elected with 56.02% of the vote in 2020. Soto won re-election in 2022.

The boundaries of the district have been redrawn from 2020 determined by the 2020 redistricting cycle.

Democratic primary

Candidates

Nominee
Darren Soto, incumbent U.S. representative

Endorsements

Republican primary

Candidates

Nominee
Scotty Moore, life coach and Christian missionary

Eliminated in primary
Jose Castillo, businessman and candidate for this district in 2020
Adianis Morales, pastor and organizer
Sergio Ortiz, mortgage banker and candidate for this district in 2020

Withdrawn
Bill Olson, former U.S. Army sergeant and nominee for this district in 2020 (running for state representative) (endorsed Castillo)

Endorsements

Results

General election

Predictions

Results

District 10

Democrat Val Demings, who has represented the district since 2017, was re-elected with 63% of the vote in 2020. Demings did not run for re-election and instead ran for the 2022 United States Senate election in Florida.

The boundaries of the district have been redrawn from 2020 determined by the 2020 redistricting cycle.

Democratic primary

Candidates

Nominee
Maxwell Frost, former National Organizing Director for March for Our Lives

Eliminated in primary
Jack Joseph Achenbach, dietician and personal chef
Jeffrey Boone, financial executive and bitcoin investor
 Randolph Bracy, state senator from the 11th district (2016–present)
Corrine Brown, former U.S. Representative for Florida's 5th congressional district (2013–2017) and 3rd district (1993–2013) and convicted felon
Terence Gray, pastor
Alan Grayson, former U.S. Representative from Florida's 9th congressional district (2013–2017) and 8th district (2009–2011), candidate for U.S. Senate in 2016 and 2022
Natalie Jackson, lawyer
Khalid Muneer, former banker, real estate broker and civic activist
Teresa Tachon, public school teacher

Did not qualify
Eric Atkinson, programmer, accountant, and U.S. Marine Corps veteran

Withdrew
Aramis Ayala, state attorney for the Ninth Judicial Circuit Court of Florida (2017–2021) (running for Attorney General)

Declined
 Val Demings, incumbent U.S. representative (running for U.S. Senate)

Endorsements

Polling

Results

Republican primary

Candidates

Nominee
Calvin Wimbish, sales manager and retired U.S. Army colonel

Eliminated in primary
Lateresa Jones, perennial candidate
Tuan Le, cafe owner and electrical engineer
Thuy Lowe, nominee for this district in 2016
Willie Montague, pastor and candidate for this district in 2020
Peter Weed

Did not qualify
Troy Rambaransingh, website consultant

Withdrawn 
William King
Carter Morgan
Angela Walls-Windhauser, businesswoman and perennial candidate

Endorsements

Polling

Results

Independent and third-party candidates

Independents

Declared
Jason Holic, businessman
Usha Jain, perennial candidate

General election

Predictions

Results

District 11

Republican Daniel Webster, who has represented the district since 2011, was re-elected with 66% of the vote in 2020. Webster won re-election in 2022.

The boundaries of the district have been redrawn from 2020 determined by the 2020 redistricting cycle.

Republican primary

Nominee 
 Daniel Webster, incumbent U.S. representative

Eliminated in primary
Gavriel Soriano, small business owner
Laura Loomer, reporter for InfoWars, activist, and nominee for the 21st district in 2020

Did not qualify 

 Al Deno, entertainer

Endorsements

Results

Democratic primary

Candidates

Nominee 
Shante Munns, businesswoman

Independents

Candidates

Declared 
Kevin Porter

Did not qualify
Antonio Rosado

General election

Predictions

Results

District 12

Republican Gus Bilirakis, who has represented the district since 2007, was re-elected with 63% of the vote in 2020. Bilirakis won re-election in 2022.

The boundaries of the district have been redrawn from 2020 determined by the 2020 redistricting cycle.

Republican primary

Candidates

Nominee
 Gus Bilirakis, incumbent U.S. representative

Eliminated in primary
Chris Leiser
Jack Martin, pastor
Brian Perras, U.S. Navy veteran and candidate for CA-29 in 2020
Sid Preskitt, commercial diving contractor

Endorsements

Results

Democratic primary

Candidates

Nominee
 Kimberly Walker, businesswoman and U.S. Air Force veteran

General election

Predictions

Results

District 13

Democrat Charlie Crist was re-elected with 53% of the vote in 2020, having represented the district since January 3, 2017. Crist did not run for re-election to the House in 2022, instead ran for and secured the Democratic nomination for the 2022 Florida gubernatorial election. Crist resigned from the House early on August 31, 2022.

The boundaries of the district had been redrawn from 2020 determined by the 2020 redistricting cycle.

This district was included on the list of Democratic-held seats the National Republican Congressional Committee was targeting in 2022.

Democratic primary

Candidates

Nominee
Eric Lynn, former senior advisor to the United States Secretary of Defense, candidate for this district in 2016

Disqualified 
Christian Hotchkiss, service representative at Macy's, Inc.

Withdrawn
Ben Diamond, state representative from district 68 and grandson of former U.S. Representative Dante Fascell
Michele Rayner, state representative from district 70 (2020–present) (running for re-election, endorsed Lynn)

Declined
Charlie Crist, incumbent U.S. representative (running for governor)
Rick Kriseman, former mayor of St. Petersburg and former state representative

Endorsements

Republican primary

Candidates

Nominee
Anna Paulina Luna, director of Hispanic Engagement for Turning Point USA, U.S. Air Force veteran, and nominee for this district in 2020

Eliminated in primary
Kevin Hayslett, attorney
Moneer Kheireddine, freelance writer
Amanda Makki, attorney and candidate for this district in 2020
Christine Quinn, businesswoman and nominee for FL-14 in 2016 and 2020

Withdrew
William Braddock
Audrey Henson, businesswoman (running for state representative)

Endorsements

Debate

Polling

Results

Independent and third-party candidates

Libertarian Party

Nominee 

Frank Craft, business owner

Write-ins

Declared 
Dwight Young, public safety employee and candidate for U.S. Senate in 2016
 Jacob Curnow, author and candidate for this district in 2020

General election

Predictions

Polling 
Graphical summary

Eric Lynn vs. Kevin Hayslett

Eric Lynn vs. Amanda Makki

Generic Democrat vs. generic Republican

Results

District 14

Democrat Kathy Castor, who has represented the district since 2007, was re-elected with 60% of the vote in 2020. Castor won re-election in 2022.

The boundaries of the district have been redrawn from 2020 determined by the 2020 redistricting cycle.

Democratic primary

Candidates

Nominee
 Kathy Castor, incumbent U.S. representative

Eliminated in primary
Christopher Bradley, IT Professional

Endorsements

Results

Republican primary

Candidates

Nominee
James Judge, businessman & Coast Guard veteran

Eliminated in primary
Sam Nashagh, Naval Aviator and combat veteran in the United States Marine Corps
Jerry Torres, former Green Beret, founder of Torres Advanced Enterprise Solutions (previously filed to run in the 15th district) (disqualified from race, then restored to ballot )

Withdrawn
Jay Collins, army veteran (running in the 15th district)
Christine Quinn, businesswoman and nominee for this district in 2016 and 2020 (running in the 13th district)

Endorsements

Results

General election

Predictions

Results

District 15

Florida gained one more congressional seat based on the 2020 census.

Republican primary

Candidates

Nominee
Laurel Lee, former Florida Secretary of State (2019–2022)

Eliminated in primary
Demetries Grimes, retired Navy commander
Kevin John "Mac" McGovern, retired U.S. Navy captain (previously filed to run in the 7th district)
Kelli Stargel, state senator from the 22nd district (2016–present) and 15th district (2012–2016)
Jackie Toledo, state representative

Withdrawn
Jay Collins, Army veteran (previously filed to run in the 14th district) (running for state senate) (endorsed Lee)
Dennis Ross, former U.S. Representative for the 12th district (2011–2013) and this district (2013–2019)
Jerry Torres, former Green Beret, founder of Torres Advanced Enterprise Solutions (running in the 14th district)

Endorsements

Polling

Results

Democratic primary

Candidates

Nominee
Alan Cohn, Peabody and Emmy award-winning journalist and nominee for Florida's 15th congressional district in 2014 and 2020

Eliminated in primary
Gavin Brown, political consultant
Eddie Geller, comedian
Cesar Ramirez, army veteran
William VanHorn, aerospace contractor

Did not qualify
Jesse Philippe, U.S. Marine Corps veteran and candidate for this district in 2020

Declined
Adam Hattersley, former state representative and candidate for Florida's 15th congressional district in 2020 (running for Chief Financial Officer)
Rena Frazier, co-founder of the All For Transportation pro-transit committee in Hillsborough County

Withdrew
Lily Ramcharren

Endorsements

Results

General election

Predictions

Polling

Results

District 16

Republican Vern Buchanan, who has represented the district since 2007, was reelected with 56% of the vote in 2020. Buchanan won re-election in 2022.

The boundaries of the district have been redrawn from 2020 determined by the 2020 redistricting cycle.

Republican primary

Candidates

Nominee
 Vern Buchanan, incumbent U.S. representative

Eliminated in primary
Martin Hyde, businessman

Endorsements

Polling

Results

Democratic primary

Candidates

Nominee
Jan Schneider, candidate for this district in 2016 and 2018

General election

Predictions

Results

District 17

Republican Greg Steube, who has represented the district since 2019, was re-elected with 64% of the vote in 2020. Steube won re-election in 2022.

The boundaries of the district have been redrawn from 2020 determined by the 2020 redistricting cycle.

Republican primary

Candidates

Nominee
Greg Steube, incumbent U.S. Representative

Endorsements

Democratic primary

Candidates

Nominee 
Andrea Doria Kale

Declined
Allen Ellison, political consultant and nominee for this district in 2018 and 2020 (running in District 23)

Independent and third party candidates

Candidates

Declared
Theodore Murray, former high school football coach and candidate for this district in 2020

General election

Predictions

Results

District 18

Republican Scott Franklin, who has represented the district since 2021, was elected with 55% of the vote in 2020. Franklin won re-election in 2022.

The boundaries of the district have been redrawn from 2020 determined by the 2020 redistricting cycle.

Republican primary

Candidates

Nominee
 Scott Franklin, incumbent U.S. Representative

Eliminated in primary
Kenneth Hartpence, network engineer
Jennifer Raybon, attorney
Wendy Schmeling, pastor
Eddie Tarazona, cigar company owner

Results

Independent and third party candidates

Independent

Candidates
Keith R Hayden Jr, US Navy Veteran

Predictions

Results

District 19

Republican Byron Donalds, who has represented the district since 2021, was elected with 61% of the vote in 2020. Donalds won re-election in 2022.

The boundaries of the district have been redrawn from 2020 determined by the 2020 redistricting cycle.

Republican primary

Candidates

Nominee
Byron Donalds, incumbent U.S. Representative

Eliminated in primary
Jim Huff, civilian member of the United States Army Corps of Engineers

Endorsements

Results

Democratic primary

Candidates

Nominee
Cindy Banyai, political science professor at Florida Gulf Coast University and nominee for this district in 2020

General election

Predictions

Results

District 20

Democrat Alcee Hastings, who represented the district since 1993, was re-elected with 78% of the vote in 2020. Hastings died on April 6, 2021. A special election was held on January 11, 2022, to succeed him, which was won by Sheila Cherfilus-McCormick. Cherfilus-McCormick won re-election in 2022.

Democratic primary

Candidates

Nominee
Sheila Cherfilus-McCormick, incumbent U.S. Representative

Eliminated in primary
Dale Holness, former mayor of Broward County and candidate for this district in the 2022 special election
Anika Omphroy, state representative

Did not qualify
Dwight Anderson, businessman
Pradel Vilme, businessman and candidate for this district in the 2022 special election

Declined
Omari Hardy, former state representative and candidate for this district in the 2022 special election
Perry E. Thurston Jr., former state senator and candidate for this district in the 2022 special election
Bobby DuBose, former minority leader of the Florida House of Representatives and candidate for this district in the 2022 special election
Barbara Sharief, former mayor of Broward County and candidate for this district in the 2022 special election (running for state senate; endorsed Cherfilus-McCormick)

Polling

Endorsements

Results

Republican primary

Candidates

Nominee 
Dr. Drew Montez Clark, businessman

Did not qualify
Vic DeGrammont, businessman and candidate for this district in the 2022 special election

General election

Predictions

Results

District 21

Republican Brian Mast, who has represented the district since 2017, was re-elected with 56% of the vote in 2020. Mast won re-election in 2022.

The boundaries of the district have been redrawn from 2020 determined by the 2020 redistricting cycle.

Republican primary

Candidates

Nominee
Brian Mast, incumbent U.S. Representative

Eliminated in primary
Jeff Buongiorno, former deputy sheriff
Melissa Martz, attorney
Ljubo Skrbic, doctor

Results

Democratic primary

Candidates

Nominee
Corinna Robinson

General election

Predictions

Results

District 22

Democrat Lois Frankel, who has represented the district since 2013, was re-elected with 59% of the vote in 2020. Frankel won re-election in 2022.

The boundaries of the district have been redrawn from 2020 determined by the 2020 redistricting cycle.

Democratic primary

Candidates

Nominee
 Lois Frankel, incumbent U.S. representative

Endorsements

Republican primary

Candidates

Nominee
Daniel John Franzese

Eliminated in primary
Deborah Adeimy
Peter Arianas
Rod Dorilás, Navy veteran
Carrie Lawlor

Declined 
Laura Loomer, reporter for InfoWars, far-right activist, and nominee for this district in 2020 (running in the 11th district)

Endorsements

Results

General election

Predictions

Results

District 23

Democrat Ted Deutch, who has represented the district since 2010, was re-elected with 58% of the vote in 2020. On February 28, 2022, Deutch announced he would leave Congress to become CEO of the American Jewish Committee. Deutch resigned early on September 30, 2022.

The boundaries of the district have been redrawn from 2020 determined by the 2020 redistricting cycle.

Democratic primary

Candidates

Nominee
Jared Moskowitz, Broward County commissioner, former director of the Florida Division of Emergency Management, and former state representative

Eliminated in primary
Allen Ellison, political consultant and nominee for FL-17 in 2018 and 2020
Michaelangelo Hamilton
Hava Holzhauer, former Anti-Defamation League Florida regional director
Ben Sorensen, Fort Lauderdale city commissioner and vice-mayor
Michael Trout, perennial candidate

Withdrawn
Curtis Calabrese, commercial airline pilot and naval air combat veteran
Imtiaz Mohammad

Declined
Mark Bogen, Broward County commissioner
Lauren Book, minority leader of the Florida Senate
Ted Deutch, incumbent U.S Representative
Fred Guttenberg, gun-control activist (endorsed Moskowitz)
Chad Klitzman, former Obama staffer
Tina Polsky, state senator (endorsed Moskowitz)
Dean Trantalis, mayor of Fort Lauderdale
Dave Aronberg, Palm Beach County State Attorney and former state senator
Gary Farmer, state senator and former minority leader of the Florida Senate (currently running for Florida's 17th circuit court)

Endorsements

Results

Republican primary

Candidates

Nominee
Joe Budd, entrepreneur

Eliminated in primary
Darlene Swaffar, insurance agent and candidate for this district in 2020
Steve Chess, retired chiropractor
Christy McLaughlin, candidate for FL-23 in 2020
Myles Perrone
James Pruden, attorney and nominee for this district in 2020
Ira Weinstein

Declined
Chip LaMarca, state representative (running for re-election)
George Moraitis, former state representative

Endorsements

Results

Independent and third party candidates

Independents

Declared
Mark Napier, former CIA officer
Christine Scott

General election

Predictions

Results

District 24

Democrat Frederica Wilson, who has represented the district since 2011, was re-elected with 76% of the vote in 2020. Wilson won re-election in 2022.

The boundaries of the district have been redrawn from 2020 determined by the 2020 redistricting cycle.

Democratic primary

Candidates

Nominee
 Frederica Wilson, incumbent U.S Representative

Eliminated in primary
Kevin Harris, first responder

Endorsements

Results

Republican primary

Candidates

Nominee
Jesus Navarro

Eliminated in primary
Lavern Spicer, nonprofit executive and nominee for this district in 2020

Declined 
Patricia Gonzalez

Endorsements

Results

General election

Predictions

Results

District 25

Democrat Debbie Wasserman Schultz, who has represented the district since 2005, was re-elected with 58% of the vote in 2020. Wasserman Schultz won re-election in 2022.

The boundaries of the district have been redrawn from 2020 determined by the 2020 redistricting cycle.

Democratic primary

Candidates

Nominee
Debbie Wasserman Schultz, incumbent U.S. representative

Eliminated in primary
Robert Millwee

Endorsements

Results

Republican primary

Candidates

Nominee
Carla Spalding, nurse, Independent candidate for the 18th district in 2016, candidate for this district in 2018, and nominee in 2020

Eliminated in primary
Rubin Young

Did not qualify 
Saad Suleman

Endorsements

Results

General election

Predictions

Results

District 26

Republican Mario Díaz-Balart, who has represented the district since 2003, was unopposed in 2020. Díaz-Balart won re-election in 2022.

The boundaries of the district have been redrawn from 2020 determined by the 2020 redistricting cycle.

Republican primary

Candidates

Nominee
Mario Díaz-Balart, incumbent U.S. representative

Eliminated in primary
Darren Aquino

Endorsements

Results

Democratic primary

Candidates

Nominee 
Christine Olivo

Withdrew
Adam Gentle (Running for FL State House)

Endorsements

General election

Predictions

Results

District 27

Republican Maria Elvira Salazar, who had represented the district since 2021, flipped the district and was elected with 51% of the vote in 2020. Salazar won re-election in 2022.

The boundaries of the district were redrawn from 2020, as determined by the 2020 redistricting cycle.

This district was included on the list of Republican-held seats the Democratic Congressional Campaign Committee was targeting in 2022.

Republican primary

Candidates

Nominee
Maria Elvira Salazar, incumbent U.S. Representative

Eliminated in primary
Frank Polo

Endorsements

Results

Democratic primary

Candidates

Nominee
Annette Taddeo, state senator, nominee for FL-18 in 2008 and for lieutenant governor in 2014, and candidate for FL-26 in 2016 (previously ran for Governor)

Eliminated in primary
Angel Montalvo, progressive activist
Ken Russell, Miami City Commissioner

Withdrawn
Eileen Higgins, Miami-Dade County commissioner
Janelle Perez, co-owner of Doctors Healthcare Plans Inc., a medicare managed–care company, and former Republican staffer for U.S. House Committee on Foreign Affairs (Running for SD-37)

Declined
Debbie Mucarsel-Powell, former U.S. representative for the 26th district
Donna Shalala, former U.S. representative (endorsed Taddeo)

Endorsements

Polling

Results

Independents

Candidates

Declared
Ian Medina

General election

Predictions

Polling
Graphical summary

María Elvira Salazar vs. Ken Russell

Results

District 28

Republican Carlos Giménez, who has represented the 26th district since 2021, flipped that district and was elected with 52% of the vote in 2020. Giménez won re-election in the new 28th district in 2022.

The boundaries of the district have been redrawn from 2020 determined by the 2020 redistricting cycle.

This district is included on the list of Republican-held seats the Democratic Congressional Campaign Committee is targeting in 2022.

Republican primary

Candidates

Nominee
 Carlos Giménez, incumbent U.S. Representative

Eliminated in primary
Carlos Garin
KW Miller

Endorsements

Results

Democratic primary

Candidates

Nominee
Robert Asencio, former state representative and former captain of the Miami-Dade Schools Police Department

Eliminated in primary
Juan Parades

Declined
 Debbie Mucarsel-Powell, former U.S. representative
David Richardson, Miami Beach commissioner

Endorsements

Results

General election

Predictions

Polling

Results

See also
 Elections in Florida
 Political party strength in Florida
 Florida Democratic Party
 Florida Republican Party
 Government of Florida
 2022 United States Senate election in Florida
 2022 Florida gubernatorial election
2022 Florida House of Representatives election
 2022 Florida Senate election
 2022 Florida elections
2022 United States gubernatorial elections
 2022 United States elections

Notes

Partisan clients

References

External links
 Division of Elections - Florida Department of State

Florida
2022
United States House of Representatives